Indian Creek is a climbing area in the northern part of the Bears Ears National Monument in the canyonlands area of San Juan County, Utah, United States. that is renowned for its sandstone crack climbing.

Gallery

See also
 Bridger Jack Butte
 Sixshooter Peaks

References

External links

Climbing areas of Utah
Canyons and gorges of Utah
Landforms of San Juan County, Utah